The women's 20 kilometres walk at the 2015 World Championships in Athletics was held at the Beijing National Stadium on 28 August.

Summary 
The defending champion Elena Lashmanova would not be here, while she serves her drug suspension.  In fact the entire Russian team did not compete here amid the drug scandal surrounding their coach Viktor Chegin.  It looked like world record holder, world leader Liu Hong, walking on home soil was the prohibitive favorite. Liu's one complication was her teammate Xiuzhi Lu.  Like in the men's race, the two Chinese walkers took off hard from the start, only Anežka Drahotová tried to go with them.  That lasted about 4 km, from that point on the two walkers were out on their own almost tied by a string, swapping the lead occasionally though Lu was setting the pace the majority of the time.  They hit 5K in 22:24; 10K in 44:19 (21:55 split) with a 30-second lead and 15K in 1:06:24 (22:05 split).  The chase pack was Lyudmyla Olyanovska,  Elisa Rigaudo, Eleonora Giorgi and Érica de Sena.  de Sena was the first to fall off pace around 12K, both of the Italians were later asked to leave the course.  Between 10 and 15K the lead actually shrunk to 20 seconds, but the closing 5K in 21:22 settled it for everyone but the two Chinese walkers.  They battled neck and neck until just about the time they re-entered the stadium, when Lu seemed to concede to Liu and walked the remainder on the track in her footsteps.  With the domestic crowd going crazy, Lu crossed the finish line virtually in Liu's shadow, the separation .26 of a second for the closest finish for a race walk in World Championships history.  Because it is a road course, the official times are only accurate to one second so both athlete's times round to the same time.  Olyanovska continued to hold on, finishing just 28 seconds back for bronze.  The rest of the field finished more than 1:15 behind her.
It was the first gold medal for the home team at these championships.

Records 
Prior to the competition, the records were as follows:

Qualification standards

Schedule

Results 
The race was started at 08:30.

References 

20 kilometres walk
Racewalking at the World Athletics Championships
2015 in women's athletics